John Scott Tynes (born 1971) is an American writer best known for his work on role-playing games such as Unknown Armies, Delta Green, Puppetland, and for his company, Tynes Cowan Corporation.  Under its imprint, Pagan Publishing, Tynes Cowan Corp. produces third-party books for the Call of Cthulhu role-playing game under license from Chaosium as well as fiction and non-fiction books under its imprint, Armitage House.

Career
John Tynes founded Pagan Publishing in 1990 at the age of 19 in Columbia, Missouri, with a volunteer staff. Tynes founded Pagan's The Unspeakable Oath magazine. Dennis Detwiller got in touch with Tynes after seeing an issue of The Unspeakable Oath, and then started volunteering with the company. Tynes designed the board game Creatures & Cultists. In May 1994, Tynes took a job with Wizards of the Coast, working under the new Wizards RPG department lead, Jonathan Tweet. Tynes was the first content lead on the Magic: The Gathering trading card game. Tynes decided to move Pagan Publishing to Seattle that year, and the company became incorporated. After the move many of the projects Tynes envisioned for the company materialized. In June 1995, Tynes resigned from Wizards of the Coast, disliking their new corporate ideals of branding, and briefly moved on to Daedalus Games. Daedalus hired him as their RPG line editor. With Dennis Detwiller and Adam Scott Glancy, Tynes developed the Delta Green (1996) supplement to Call of Cthulhu; they expanded their setting in 1999 with "Delta Green: Countdown". Tynes continued to work for Daedalus Games until they ceased production in 1997.

Tynes met Greg Stolze while they were working on "Wildest Dreams" (1993), a supplement for Over the Edge.  Stolze and Tynes co-designed the role-playing game Unknown Armies; Stolze helped write the mechanics for the game which Tynes had been developing for a few years. Although Atlas Games expressed interest in Unknown Armies, Tynes decided to go with Archon Games, but Tynes and Stolze learned that founder Lisa Manns was shutting down Archon and she returned the rights to them. They sought a new publisher, and Atlas Games published the game in January 1999. Atlas officially brought Tynes on as a line editor for Unknown Armies in 1999.

Tynes designed Puppetland (1999) for Hogshead Publishing. Tynes and Robin Laws wrote a new version of the  Feng Shui role-playing game for Atlas Games, published in 1999. Tynes was the original line editor for Feng Shui. Tynes wrote the adventure "Three Days to Kill" (2000) for the Atlas d20 brand, Penumbra, and the adventure was the first printed d20 product ever offered for sale. Tynes designed the board game The Hills Rise Wild!

On January 1, 2001, Tynes announced to his partners that he was leaving the role-playing game industry, expecting to be done with the field by 2002, and Adam Scott Glancy was named the new president of Pagan. Wizards of the Coast contacted him with an offer to write the background material for the d20 version of Call of Cthulhu, which he accepted, and he produced the material with the help of writers from Pagan. The book was completed in 2002.

Following the end of Unknown Armies in 2003, Tynes withdrew from the tabletop gaming industry in order to pursue other interests, particularly film and video games. He was the producer of Pirates of the Burning Sea, a massively multiplayer online role-playing game developed by Flying Lab Software, and published in 2008 by Sony Online Entertainment.  After its launch, he joined Microsoft Game Studios to work on various Xbox Live Arcade titles including South Park Let's Go Tower Defense Play!, Toy Soldiers, and Full House Poker as a producer and game designer.

Tynes has written about games for Salon, The Escapist, Pyramid, X360 UK, and The Stranger.

References

External links
 Personal website
 Pen & Paper RPG Database entry for John Tynes

Video game designers
Role-playing game designers
Atlas Games people
Living people
1971 births
Place of birth missing (living people)
People from Columbia, Missouri